Jarosław Lewak (born 2 February 1973) is a Polish judoka. He competed at the 1996 Summer Olympics and the 2000 Summer Olympics.

Achievements

References

External links
 
 Videos of Jarosław Lewak (judovision.org)

1973 births
Living people
Polish male judoka
Judoka at the 1996 Summer Olympics
Judoka at the 2000 Summer Olympics
Olympic judoka of Poland
Sportspeople from Warsaw